Kinjirō, Kinjiro or Kinjirou (written: , ,  or ) is a masculine Japanese given name. Notable people with the name include:

, American inventor and politician
, Japanese table tennis player
, Japanese electrical engineer
, Japanese footballer

Japanese masculine given names